Kathy Tu is an Asian-American podcaster and current head of production at Wondery. Tu previously co-hosted Nancy (WNYC/New York Public Radio) until 2020 and worked for New York Times Opinion podcasts.

Tu was listed on Fast Companys "Queer 50" list in 2022.

References

External links 

Living people
American podcasters
American women podcasters
Year of birth missing (living people)